Krishnadev is an Indian masculine given name. Notable people with the given name include:

Krishnadev Prasad Gaud (1895–?), Indian Bhojpuri poet
Krishnadev Yagnik (born 1984), Indian film director and screenwriter

Indian masculine given names